Suzanne Miller (September 10, 1950 – December 20, 2013), better known by her ring name Vivian St. John, was an American female professional wrestler.

Wrestling career
St. John began her wrestling debut on August 6, 1974 and was trained by The Fabulous Moolah. In 1986, she retired from wrestling after falling pregnant with her daughter, Nicole.

Personal life and death
St. John was born as Suzanne Miller on September 10, 1950 in Cincinnati, Ohio. Her brother, Bryan, was also a professional wrestler. She had a later career as psychic Lady Suzanne, reading people's fortunes and contributing to the 2012 book Curses And Their Reversals.

Vivian St. John died following a long illness on December 20, 2013, aged 63, in Fort Lauderdale, Florida. She was survived by her daughter, Nicole.

Bibliography
 Miller, Lady Suzanne; D'Andrea, Maria; Dragonstar; Oribello, William Alexander (2012). Curses And Their Reversals – Plus: Omens, Superstitions And The Removal Of The Evil Eye New Brunswick, NJ: Global Communications.

References

External links
 
 Vivian St. John on Cagematch 

1950 births
2013 deaths
Sportspeople from Cincinnati
Sportspeople from Fort Lauderdale, Florida
Professional wrestlers from Ohio
Professional wrestlers from Florida
American female professional wrestlers
American psychics
21st-century American women